Yenotayevka is a rural locality (a selo) and the administrative center of Yenotayevsky District of Astrakhan Oblast, Russia. Population:

References

Notes

Sources

Rural localities in Yenotayevsky District